Aegiochus piihuka is a species of isopod in the family Aegidae, and was first described in 2009 by Niel L. Bruce. The species epithet, piihuka, is a Mäori word meaning hook, and refers to the hooked anterior legs.

The species is associated with hexactinellid sponges.

It is found in waters of the coasts of New Zealand and Australia, off Queensland and New South Wales.

References

Cymothoida
Crustaceans described in 2009
Taxa named by Niel L. Bruce